Phenylpyrazole insecticides are a class of chemically-related broad-spectrum insecticides.  The chemical structures of these insecticides are characterized by a central pyrazole ring with a phenyl group attached to one of the nitrogen atoms of the pyrazole.

History
Phenylpyrazole insecticides were developed in response to increasing pesticide resistance to other chemicals.
Now, along with neonicotinoids, they are some of the most widely-used pesticides.

Mode of Action
Phenylpyrazole insecticides function by blocking glutamate-activated chloride channels in insects.
Mammals do not have this type of chloride channel, making them much less susceptible to its effects.
However, they do have the capacity to disrupt epithelial cells in the human intestine and adversely impact human health.

Examples
Examples include:
 acetoprole
 ethiprole
 fipronil
 flufiprole
 pyraclofos
 pyrafluprole
 pyriprole
 pyrolan
 vaniliprole

References

External links
 

Pyrazoles
Insecticides
Synthetic insecticides